Thomas Edgar may refer to:

 Thomas Edgar (MP) (died 1547), 16th-century English politician
 Thomas F. Edgar (born 1945), American chemical engineer
 Thomas Edgar (volleyball) (born 1989), Australian volleyball player